Katnaghbyur or Katnaghbur may refer to:
Katnaghbyur, Aragatsotn, Armenia
Katnaghbyur, Kotayk, Armenia
Katnaghbyur, Lori, Armenia